Mul is a town and a municipal council in Chandrapur district in the Indian state of Maharashtra. Pincode of Mul is 441224.

Geography
It has an average elevation of 198 metres (649 feet).

Places to visit: Somnath is just 9 km away from Mul, well connected via road. Somnath is a well-known tourist place around Chandrapur district. Amtepharm is located in Somnath, which is run by Baba Amthe for leprotic patients.

There is also a ritual place known as markandadeo at about 25 km from mul. There is lord shiva Temple is situated in village at the bank of the Wainganga river, which flows generally from North to South but at Markanda it takes Northward turn for 20 km before again going Southward. It is believed that this uttar vahini (Northward flow) of wainganga river makes this place more sacred to worship lord shiva. A great yatra is heals here on occasion of mahashivratri and thousand of devotees gathers together to worship lord shiva.

Mul is mainly known for rice production, having 53 rice mills covering 90% of rice production in whole Chandrapur district, Maharastra.
Rice is supplied throughout Maharashtra involving big cities like Mumbai, Pune, Nagpur, Amravati, and Nashik.

The educational facility in Mul was very poor. It found surprising that there is no well-known B.Sc., M.Sc. college for higher studies. But fortunately, Karmaveer college is offering Bachelore in science since 3 to 4 years. Also, many CBSE schools are offering quality education.

Demographics
 India census, Mul had a population of 22,256. Males constitute 51% of the population and females 49%. Mul has an average literacy rate of 67%, higher than the national average of 59.5%: male literacy is 74%, and female literacy is 60%. In Mul, 13% of the population is under 6 years of age. Mul has very big area for MIDC; need to think about development of this area. Power plants are being constructed at MIDC area, near Maregaon. Those who are staying in Mul have struggled for higher studies; there are no colleges for B.Sc., Engineering.

Transport
Mul is connected to the district place Chandrapur by road. The MSRTC buses regularly ply to Chandrapur, Gadchiroli, Nagbhid, Nagpur, Saoli, Sindewahi. Mul is very well connected via train. Daily DMO runs between Chandrapur and Wadsa via Mul. Now people can enjoy long journey from Mul which connected to Bilaspur and Bangalore via weekly trains.

References

Cities and towns in Chandrapur district
Talukas in Maharashtra